Grega Žemlja was the defending champion, but chose not to compete.
Top seeded Lu Yen-Hsun beat Go Soeda 6–2, 6–4, to claim the title.

Seeds

Draw

Finals

Top half

Bottom half

References
 Main Draw
 Qualifying Draw

Beijing International Challenger - Singles
2013 Men's Singles